Milan Vidakov (born 19 August 2002) is a Serbian professional footballer who plays as a centre-forward for Vojvodina.

Club career

Early career
Vidakov was a member of the younger selections of Belgrade's Partizan. At the beginning of 2018, he moved to Vojvodina from Novi Sad, and before the end of the same year, he signed a professional contract with the club.

Vojvodina
During the spring part of the 2018–19 Serbian SuperLiga, he was part of the first team of Vojvodina, but he played for the youth team until the end of the season. The following summer, he was transferred to the OFK Vršac team. With the efficiency of 11 goals in 15 games in the Serbian League Vojvodina, Vidakov was the best scorer in the first part of the 2019–20 season. During the winter break, Vojvodina returned him from the loan, and then passed him on to the Serbian First League team Kabel. After one and a half seasons, Vidakov went to the team of Mladost Novi Sad on the next loan, in the summer of 2021. After winning the first place on the table of the Serbian First League with Mladost Novi Sad, where he was the most efficient scorer of the competition, Vidakov returned to Vojvodina. On the last day of May 2022, he extended the contract until the end of the calendar year 2024.

Career statistics

Honours
Mladost Novi Sad
Serbian First League: 2021–22

Individual
 Serbian First League Top Scorer: 2021–22

References

External links
 
 
 

2000 births
People from Ruma
Living people
Serbian footballers
Association football forwards
FK Vojvodina players
FK Kabel players
Serbian SuperLiga players
Serbian First League players